"Freak Me" is a song by American R&B group Silk. It was released in February 1993 as the second single from their debut album, Lose Control. It was co-written and co-produced by Keith Sweat, for whom Silk was a touring opening act. Tim Cameron, Jimmy Gates and Gary "Lil G" Jenkins sing lead on the song. The song was the group's highest-charting hit, reaching number-one on both the Billboard Hot 100 for two weeks, and the U.S. Hot R&B Singles chart for eight weeks. On the Hot 100, this song also spent ten weeks at number two. It was certified platinum by the Recording Industry Association of America (RIAA) and sold over 1.3 million copies domestically.

The song was covered by Another Level, and their version reached No. 1 on the UK chart.

Music video
Two versions of the music video for "Freak Me" were produced: the first was directed by Bronwen Hughes, while the second was directed by Lionel C. Martin.

Track listing
 US 12" vinyl"
1 "Freak Me" [Remix] – 4:55 Featuring – Teno West – Actual Performer on song 
2 "Freak Me" [Jeep Beat Mix] – 4:55 Featuring – Teno West – Actual Performer on song 
3 "Freak Me" [LP Version] – 4:35 Featuring – Teno West – Actual Performer on song   
4 "Happy Days" [Instrumental] – 3:45
 Maxi-CD
1 "Freak Me" [LP Version] – 4:35 Featuring – Teno West – Actual Performer on song
2 "Freak Me" [Remix] – 4:55 Featuring – Teno West – Actual Performer on song 
3 "Freak Me" [Jeep Beat Mix] – 4:55 Featuring – Teno West – Actual Performer on song 
4 "Freak Me" [Extended Version] – 5:38 Featuring – Teno West – Actual Performer on song
5 "Freak Me" [Christine Henke cover] – 3:58 Featuring – Dioni [on the remix] – 2007

Charts

Weekly charts

Year-end charts

Decade-end charts

All-time charts

Certifications

Another Level version

The song was covered by British boy band Another Level in 1998. It was released on 6 July 1998 as the second single from the band's self-titled debut album. This version reached number one on the UK Singles Chart, overtaking Billie's "Because We Want To". It was produced by Fitzgerald Scott, Cutfather and Joe; it was the seventeenth biggest-selling boy band single of the 1990s in the UK, selling over 415,000 copies.

Track listing
UK CD single (1)
"Freak Me" 
"Whatever You Want"
"Freak Me" 

UK CD single (2)
"Freak Me" 
"Freak Me" 
"Freak Me" 

German CD single
"Freak Me" (C&J Radio Edit) — 3:39
"Freak Me"  — 6:09

German CD maxi-single
"Freak Me" 
"Whatever You Want"
"Freak Me" 
"Freak Me" 
"Freak Me" 
"Freak Me"

Credits and personnel
Production – Fitzgerald Scott
Engineering – Alex Nesmith
Programming – Alex Nesmith
Co-production – Cutfather and Joe
Keyboards, programming – Joe Belmaati
Rhodes piano – Tue Röh
Engineering – Bernard Löhr

Source:

Charts

Year-end charts

Certifications

See also
List of number-one R&B singles of 1993 (U.S.)
List of Billboard Hot 100 number-one singles of 1993
List of UK Singles Chart number ones of the 1990s

References

1992 songs
1993 singles
1998 singles
Billboard Hot 100 number-one singles
UK Singles Chart number-one singles
Silk (group) songs
Another Level (band) songs
Songs written by Keith Sweat
Song recordings produced by Cutfather & Joe
Contemporary R&B ballads
1990s ballads